Vladislav Joseph Chalupa (6 February 1871 – 24 June 1957) was a Czech-born cyclist who competed for France in the men's sprint event at the 1900 Summer Olympics.

References

External links
 

1871 births
1957 deaths
French male cyclists
Olympic cyclists of France
Cyclists at the 1900 Summer Olympics
People from Olomouc District
Sportspeople from Olomouc